Kononovskaya is a rural locality (a village) in Dvinitskoye Rural Settlement, Syamzhensky District, Vologda Oblast, Russia. The population was 63 as of 2002.

Geography 
Kononovskaya is located 54 km northeast of Syamzha (the district's administrative centre) by road. Samsonovskaya is the nearest rural locality.

References 

Rural localities in Syamzhensky District